The 2019 UEFA Women's Under-17 Championship (also known as UEFA Women's Under-17 Euro 2019) was the 12th edition of the UEFA Women's Under-17 Championship, the annual international youth football championship organised by UEFA for the women's under-17 national teams of Europe. Bulgaria, which were selected by UEFA on 9 December 2016, hosted the tournament from 5 to 17 May 2019.

A total of eight teams played in the tournament, with players born on or after 1 January 2002 eligible to participate. Starting from this season, up to five substitutions are permitted per team in each match. Moreover, each match has a regular duration of 90 minutes, instead of 80 minutes in previous seasons.

Germany won their seventh title after beating Netherlands on penalties. Spain were the defending champions and were knocked out from the tournament by Netherlands in the semifinal.

Qualification

A total of 47 UEFA nations entered the competition (including Albania who entered for the first time), and with the hosts Bulgaria qualifying automatically, the other 46 teams competed in the qualifying competition to determine the remaining seven spots in the final tournament. The qualifying competition consisted of two rounds: Qualifying round, which took place in autumn 2018, and Elite round, which took place in spring 2019.

Qualified teams
The following teams qualified for the final tournament.

Final draw
The final draw was held on 5 April 2019, 11:30 EEST (UTC+3), at the Flamingo Grand Hotel & Spa in Albena, Bulgaria. The eight teams were drawn into two groups of four teams. There was no seeding, except that the hosts Bulgaria were assigned to position A1 in the draw.

Venues

The tournament would originally be held in four venues, but because the condition of the pitch in Balchik was too poor only three were used:

Squads
Each national team have to submit a squad of 20 players (Regulations Article 39).

Group stage
The final tournament schedule was announced on 12 April 2019.

The group winners and runners-up advance to the semi-finals.

Tiebreakers
In the group stage, teams are ranked according to points (3 points for a win, 1 point for a draw, 0 points for a loss), and if tied on points, the following tiebreaking criteria are applied, in the order given, to determine the rankings (Regulations Articles 17.01 and 17.02):
Points in head-to-head matches among tied teams;
Goal difference in head-to-head matches among tied teams;
Goals scored in head-to-head matches among tied teams;
If more than two teams are tied, and after applying all head-to-head criteria above, a subset of teams are still tied, all head-to-head criteria above are reapplied exclusively to this subset of teams;
Goal difference in all group matches;
Goals scored in all group matches;
Penalty shoot-out if only two teams have the same number of points, and they met in the last round of the group and are tied after applying all criteria above (not used if more than two teams have the same number of points, or if their rankings are not relevant for qualification for the next stage);
Disciplinary points (red card = 3 points, yellow card = 1 point, expulsion for two yellow cards in one match = 3 points);
UEFA coefficient for the qualifying round draw;
Drawing of lots.

All times are local, EEST (UTC+3).

Group A

Group B

Knockout stage
In the knockout stage, penalty shoot-out is used to decide the winner if necessary (no extra time is played).

Bracket

Semi-finals

Final

Goalscorers

Team of the tournament
The UEFA technical observers selected the following 11 players for the team of the tournament:

International broadcasters

Television 
7 of 15 live matches and highlights will be available on UEFA.com and UEFA.tv YouTube channel for all territories around the world.

Note: Live matches on YouTube are not available in Germany, Republic of Ireland, Israel, the Middle East/North Africa, and the United States.

Participating nations

Non-participating European nations

Outside Europe

Radio

Participating nations

Non-participating European nations

References

External links
2019 #WU17EURO finals: Bulgaria, UEFA.com

 
2019
Women's Under-17 Championship
2019 Uefa Women's Under-17 Championship
2018–19 in Bulgarian football
2019 in women's association football
2019 in youth association football
May 2019 sports events in Europe